Martin Shaw (born 1945) is an English actor.

Martin Shaw may also refer to:

Martin Shaw (composer) (1875–1958), English composer, conductor and theatre producer
Martin Shaw (sociologist) (born 1947), British sociologist and academic
Martin Shaw (storyteller) (fl. 2020s), British storyteller and mythographer
Martin Shaw (bishop) (born 1944), Anglican bishop in the Scottish Episcopal Church
Martin Shaw, a character in the TV series Revolution